Schaerbeek Cemetery, officially Schaerbeek New Cemetery, is a cemetery belonging to Schaerbeek in Brussels, Belgium, where the municipality's inhabitants have the right to be buried. It is not located in Schaerbeek itself; rather it is partially in the neighbouring municipality of Evere, and partially in the village of Sint-Stevens-Woluwe in Zaventem, Flemish Brabant. The cemetery is adjacent to Brussels Cemetery and Evere Cemetery, but should not be confused with either.

Location and accessibility
Schaerbeek Cemetery is surrounded by the /, the / and the Kleine Eversweg. The entry is in Evere on the Avenue Jules Bordet.

Immediately to the west of Schaerbeek Cemetery, and separated from it by a walkway, is Evere Cemetery.

Notable interments

Personalities buried there include:
 Henri Jaspar (1870–1939), lawyer and politician
 Andrée de Jongh (1916–2007), World War II resistance, leader of the Comet Line
 René Magritte (1898–1967), Belgian surrealist, and his wife Georgette
 Marcel Mariën (1920–1993), surrealist artist
 Gabrielle Petit (1893–1916), World War I spy for the Allies

See also
 List of cemeteries in Belgium
 Ixelles Cemetery
 Laeken Cemetery
 Molenbeek-Saint-Jean Cemetery
 Saint-Josse-ten-Noode Cemetery

References

Notes

External links

 

Cemeteries in Belgium
Buildings and structures in Brussels
Buildings and structures in Flemish Brabant
Geography of Brussels
Culture in Brussels
Evere
Schaerbeek
Zaventem